Bhungane II , Bhungan'omakhulukhulu (birth name Mlotsha) was the king of AmaHlubi tribe from 1760 until his death in 1800. He was the father of King Mthimkhulu II (Ngwadlazibomvu). He was also the grandfather to the famous King Langalibalele I. King Bhungane II was a gifted medicine-man (herbalist), he also had rainmaking powers which is believed to be passed on from father to son in the Hlubi kingship.

References

History of KwaZulu-Natal
1800 deaths
Hlubi kings